Nola holsatica is a species of moth belonging to the family Nolidae.

It is native to Central Europe.

References

Nolidae
Moths described in 1916